Alpine skiing at the 2023 Winter World University Games was held at Whiteface Mountain from 13 to 21 January 2023.

Men's events

Women's events

Team event

Medal table

Participating nations
37 nations participated.

  (1)
  (4)
  (8)
  (4)
  (1)
  (1)
  (12)
 
  (8)
  (2)
  (1)
  (3)
  (7)
  (8)
  (5)
  (1)
  (5)
  (14)
  (6)
  (2)
  (1)
  (1)
  (1)
  (2)
  (1)
  (7)
  (2)
  (6)
  (6)
  (6)
  (3)
  (12)
  (15)
  (2)
  (4)
  (18)
  (6)

References

External links
 Alpine skiing at the 2023 Winter World University Games
 Schedule and results of the alpine skiing competitions
 Results book

2023 Winter World University Games
  
2023
2023 in alpine skiing
Winter World University Games